This is a list of the Yugoslavia national football team games between 1920 and 1941. Between their first match in 1920 and 1941, when competitive football stopped for the Second World War, Yugoslavia played in 109 matches, resulting in 40 victories, 17 draws and 52 defeats. Throughout this period they played in the Balkan Cup six times between 1931 and 1935 with Yugoslavia winning two titles in 1934–35 and 1935, as well as three Olympic Football Tournaments in 1920, 1924 and 1928, with Yugoslavia never going further than the first round. Yugoslavia also qualified through to one FIFA World Cup, the 1930 edition, where they got eliminated in the semi-finals by the hosts and eventual champions Uruguay. Furthermore, they also played in 11 Friendship Cups against Romania, winning 6 and losing 5.

Kingdom of Serbs, Croats and Slovenes national team
During this initial period, the Kingdom played most of its matches with the countries it formed the Little Entente with: Czechoslovakia and Romania.

1920s

1920

1921

1922

1923

1924

1925

1926

1927

1928

1929

Kingdom of Yugoslavia national team

1929

1930

1931

1932

1933

1934

1935

1936

1937

1938

1939

1940

1941

See also
Yugoslavia national football team results (1946–69)
Yugoslavia national football team results (1970–92)
Croatia national football team results
Serbia national football team results

References

External links
Results at RSSSF 

Yugoslavia national football team results